Greenleaf Lake is a lake in Le Sueur County, in the U.S. state of Minnesota.

Greenleaf Lake was named for the greenery of the forest at the lake.

See also
List of lakes in Minnesota

References

Lakes of Minnesota
Lakes of Le Sueur County, Minnesota